Narimani may refer to:
 Narimani-ye Olya
 Narimani-ye Sofla